The Kearney Symphony Orchestra is the full orchestra for Kearney, Nebraska who consist of community musicians from Central Nebraska, music instructors from the University of Nebraska-Kearney, and students from the University of Nebraska-Kearney and area high schools.  The orchestra performs four concerts each year.  The current director of the orchestra is Alison Gaines.

References

American orchestras
Performing arts in Nebraska
Musical groups from Nebraska